Anadyomenaceae is a family of green algae, in the order Cladophorales.

References

 
Ulvophyceae families
Taxa named by Friedrich Traugott Kützing